International Perspectives on Sexual and Reproductive Health, formerly International Family Planning Perspectives,  is a peer-reviewed research journal published by the Guttmacher Institute, covering research on contraception, fertility, adolescent pregnancy, sexual behaviour, sexually transmitted diseases, the policy and law on family planning and childbearing, related programmes and dissemination of information, reproductive, maternal and child health, and abortion.

The journal has been issued quarterly since 1975.

References

Sexology journals
Academic journals published by non-profit publishers